In physics, the optical theorem is a general law of wave scattering theory, which relates the forward scattering amplitude to the total cross section of the scatterer.  It is usually written in the form

Because the optical theorem is derived using only conservation of energy, or in quantum mechanics from conservation of probability, the optical theorem is widely applicable and, in quantum mechanics,  includes both elastic and inelastic scattering.

The generalized optical theorem, first derived by Werner Heisenberg, allows for arbitrary outgoing directions k':

The original optical theorem is recovered by letting .

History 

The optical theorem was originally developed independently by Wolfgang Sellmeier and Lord Rayleigh in 1871. Lord Rayleigh recognized the forward scattering amplitude in terms of the index of refraction as

(where  is the number density of scatterers),
which he used in a study of the color and polarization of the sky.

The equation was later extended to quantum scattering theory by several individuals, and came to be known as the Bohr–Peierls–Placzek relation after a 1939 paper.  It was first referred to as the "optical theorem" in print in 1955 by Hans Bethe and Frederic de Hoffmann, after it had been known as a "well known theorem of optics" for some time.

Derivation 

The theorem can be derived rather directly from a treatment of a scalar wave.  If a plane wave is incident along positive z axis on an object, then the wave scattering amplitude a great distance away from the scatterer is approximately given by

We would now like to use the fact that the intensity is proportional to the square of the amplitude .

If we drop the  term and use the fact that , we have

In optics, this is equivalent to summing over many fringes of the diffraction pattern. To further simplify matters, let's approximate . We obtain

where A is the area of the surface integrated over. Although these are improper integrals, by suitable substitutions the exponentials can be transformed into complex Gaussians and the definite integrals evaluated resulting in:
 

This is the probability of reaching the screen if none were scattered, lessened by an amount , which is therefore the effective scattering cross section of the scatterer.

See also
 S-matrix

References 

 
 

Scattering theory
Scattering, absorption and radiative transfer (optics)
Physics theorems